S.Govt College Of Science and Research, also famous as "Science College" is located in Jagraon, Ludhiana (Punjab).

There is only one college of this kind in Punjab state.  It offer students to pursue Bachelor of Science in two streams (Medical and Non-Medical).  It also offers Masters in Chemistry & Botany (limited seats affiliated by Panjab University, Chandigarh).

External links

Universities and colleges in Punjab, India
Ludhiana district